In the mathematical field of representation theory, a weight of an algebra A over a field F is an algebra homomorphism from A to F, or equivalently, a one-dimensional representation of A over F. It is the algebra analogue of a multiplicative character of a group. The importance of the concept, however, stems from its application to representations of Lie algebras and hence also to representations of algebraic and Lie groups. In this context, a weight of a representation is a generalization of the notion of an eigenvalue, and the corresponding eigenspace is called a weight space.

Motivation and general concept

Given a set S of  matrices over the same field, each of which is diagonalizable, and any two of which commute, it is always possible to simultaneously diagonalize all of the elements of S. Equivalently, for any set S of mutually commuting semisimple linear transformations of a finite-dimensional vector space V there exists a basis of V consisting of simultaneous eigenvectors of all elements of S. Each of these common eigenvectors v ∈ V defines a linear functional on the subalgebra U of End(V) generated by the set of endomorphisms S; this functional is defined as the map which associates to each element of U its eigenvalue on the eigenvector v. This map is also multiplicative, and sends the identity to 1; thus it is an algebra homomorphism from U to the base field. This "generalized eigenvalue" is a prototype for the notion of a weight.

The notion is closely related to the idea of a multiplicative character in group theory, which is a homomorphism χ from a group G to the multiplicative group of a field F. Thus χ: G → F× satisfies χ(e) = 1 (where e is the identity element of G) and
 for all g, h in G.
Indeed, if G acts on a vector space V over F, each simultaneous eigenspace for every element of G, if such exists, determines a multiplicative character on G: the eigenvalue on this common eigenspace of each element of the group.

The notion of multiplicative character can be extended to any algebra A over F, by replacing χ: G → F× by a linear map χ: A → F with:
 
for all a, b in A. If an algebra A acts on a vector space V over F to any simultaneous eigenspace, this corresponds an algebra homomorphism from A to F assigning to each element of A its eigenvalue.

If A is a Lie algebra (which is generally not an associative algebra), then instead of requiring multiplicativity of a character, one requires that it maps any Lie bracket to the corresponding commutator; but since F is commutative this simply means that this map must vanish on Lie brackets: χ([a,b])=0. A weight on a Lie algebra g over a field F is a linear map λ: g → F with λ([x, y])=0 for all x, y in g. Any weight on a Lie algebra g vanishes on the derived algebra [g,g] and hence descends to a weight on the abelian Lie algebra g/[g,g]. Thus weights are primarily of interest for abelian Lie algebras, where they reduce to the simple notion of a generalized eigenvalue for space of commuting linear transformations.

If G is a Lie group or an algebraic group, then a multiplicative character θ: G → F× induces a weight χ = dθ: g → F on its Lie algebra by differentiation. (For Lie groups, this is differentiation at the identity element of G, and the algebraic group case is an abstraction using the notion of a derivation.)

Weights in the representation theory of semisimple Lie algebras

Notably, we will explain the notion of a "dominant integral element." The representations themselves are described in the article linked to above.

Weight of a representation

.
A weight of the representation V is a linear functional λ such that the corresponding weight space is nonzero. Nonzero elements of the weight space are called weight vectors.

If V is the direct sum of its weight spaces

There is a subtle distinction between weights of group representations and Lie algebra representations, which is that there is a different notion of integrality condition in the two cases; see below. (The integrality condition is more restrictive in the group case, reflecting that not every representation of the Lie algebra comes from a representation of the group.)

Action of the root vectors

The collection of roots forms a root system.

That is,  is either the zero vector or a weight vector with weight . Thus, the action of  maps the weight space with weight  into the weight space with weight .

Integral element

For computations, it is convenient to choose an inner product that is invariant under the Weyl group, that is, under reflections about the hyperplanes orthogonal to the roots. With this identification, the coroot associated to a root  is given as 
.

The motivation for these definitions is simple: The weights of finite-dimensional representations of  satisfy the first integrality condition, while if G is a group with Lie algebra , the weights of finite-dimensional representations of G satisfy the second integrality condition.

An element  is algebraically integral if

for all roots . The motivation for this condition is that the coroot  can be identified with the H element in a standard  basis for an sl(2,C)-subalgebra of g.

The fundamental weights  are defined by the property that they form a basis of  dual to the set of coroots associated to the simple roots. That is, the fundamental weights are defined by the condition

where   are the simple roots. An element  is then algebraically integral if and only if it is an integral combination of the fundamental weights.

The figure shows the example of the Lie algebra sl(3,C), whose root system is the  root system. The weight lattice is then the triangular lattice.

Suppose now that the Lie algebra  is the Lie algebra of a Lie group G. Then we say that  is analytically integral (G-integral) if for each t in  such that  we have . The reason for making this definition is that if a representation of  arises from a representation of G, then the weights of the representation will be G-integral. For G semisimple, the set of all G-integral weights is a sublattice P(G) ⊂ P(). If G is simply connected, then P(G) = P(). If G is not simply connected, then the lattice P(G) is smaller than P() and their quotient is isomorphic to the fundamental group of G.

Partial ordering on the space of weights

We now introduce a partial ordering on the set of weights, which will be used to formulate the theorem of the highest weight describing the representations of g. Recall that R is the set of roots; we now fix a set  of positive roots.

This means, roughly, that "higher" means in the directions of the positive roots.

Dominant weight
An integral element λ is dominant if  for each positive root γ. Equivalently, λ is dominant if it is a non-negative integer combination of the fundamental weights. In the  case, the dominant integral elements live in a 60-degree sector. The notion of being dominant is not the same as being higher than zero. Note the grey area in the picture on the right is a 120-degree sector, strictly containing the 60-degree sector corresponding to the dominant integral elements.

The set of all λ (not necessarily integral) such that  is known as the fundamental Weyl chamber associated to the given set of positive roots.

Theorem of the highest weight

The theorem says that
(1) every irreducible (finite-dimensional) representation has a highest weight, 
(2) the highest weight is always a dominant, algebraically integral element, 
(3) two irreducible representations with the same highest weight are isomorphic, and 
(4) every dominant, algebraically integral element is the highest weight of an irreducible representation. 
The last point is the most difficult one; the representations may be constructed using Verma modules.

Highest-weight module
Every irreducible -module with a highest weight is necessarily a highest-weight module, but in the infinite-dimensional case, a highest weight module need not be irreducible. 
For each —not necessarily dominant or integral—there exists a unique (up to isomorphism) simple highest-weight -module with highest weight λ, which is denoted L(λ), but this module is infinite dimensional unless λ is dominant integral. It can be shown that each highest weight module with highest weight λ is a quotient of the Verma module M(λ). This is just a restatement of universality property in the definition of a Verma module.

Every finite-dimensional highest weight module is irreducible.

See also
Classifying finite-dimensional representations of Lie algebras
Representation theory of a connected compact Lie group
Highest-weight category
Root system

Notes

References

 .
 .

 .
 
 .

Lie algebras
Representation theory of Lie algebras
Representation theory of Lie groups